Orchard Place, Illinois was a small farming community in Cook County, Illinois, just west of Chicago.  Settled by German immigrants in the 1840s, it was known as Farwell before 1886 when the name was changed to Orchard Place. The Post Office opened in 1881 and changed names in 1886. The Post Office seems to have been closed in 1935.  It became a stop on the Wisconsin Central Railroad in 1887 and received the name Orchard Place at that time.  In 1942, Orchard Place was selected as the site of a new air base and aircraft manufacturing facility, Orchard Place Airport/Douglas Field.  After the Second World War, the city of Chicago bought the airport from the United States government and converted it into a commercial airport, Chicago Orchard Field, opened in 1946.

At some point prior to 1950 much of the land in the adjacent community was subdivided into residential lots, and a network of initially unpaved streets was developed.  This development covered most of the area bounded by Touhy Ave. on the North, (Des Plaines) River Road on the East, Devon Ave. and Higgins Rd. on the South, and Mannheim Rd. on the West side (the airport lay to the Southwest of the Mannhiem/Devon intersection, more-or-less diagonally across that intersection from the Orchard Place community.)  These de facto boundaries were altered slightly by the construction of the Northwest Tollway in the mid-1950s, forming a barrier separating it from the largely undeveloped southwestern corner of the area as well as the airport area in general.  Orchard Place evolved into an unincorporated residential suburban area, with housing development proceeding piecemeal as individual lots were purchased by prospective homeowners and speculative builders.  The community was annexed by referendum to the City of Des Plaines in 1956.

The airport was renamed in 1949 to O'Hare International Airport and has grown into the Chicago metropolitan area's primary airport and a major North American transportation hub. Today, the former Orchard Place is the southernmost neighborhood of Des Plaines.  The legacy of its original name persists in O'Hare's airport code, as well as in the name of Orchard Place Elementary School.

References

External links
 

Des Plaines, Illinois
Neighborhoods in Illinois
Populated places in Cook County, Illinois
Populated places established in the 1840s
German-American history